The Hugh Lake is a freshwater body crossed by the Métabetchouane River, in the unorganized territory of Lac-Croche, in the La Jacques-Cartier Regional County Municipality, in the administrative region of Capitale-Nationale, in the province of Quebec, in Canada. This lake is located in the Laurentides Wildlife Reserve.

Lake Hugh is indirectly served by route 155 (connecting La Tuque and Chambord). The forest road R0410 passes north of the lake. A few secondary forest roads serve this area for the purposes of forestry and recreational tourism activities.

Forestry is the main economic activity in the sector; recreational tourism, second.

The surface of Lake Hugh is usually frozen from the beginning of December to the end of March, however safe circulation on the ice is generally done from mid-December to mid-March.

Geography 
The main watersheds near Lake Hugh are:
 north side: Canuck stream, Métabetchouane River, Métascouac River, Saint-Henri Lake;
 east side: Petit lac Métascouac, Métascouac River, Métascouac South River, Métabetchouane East River;
 south side: Métabetchouane River, Rivière de la Place, Métabetchouane East River;
 west side: Ventadour Lake.

This lake is mainly fed by the outlet of Lake Lavoie, Métabetchouane River, the outlet of Lakes Rocand, Apollon and Esculape, the outlet of the second lake Demuth and Demuth, the outlet of Lake Douve. This lake has a narrowing in its middle because of a peninsula attached to the south shore which stretches to the northwest on  one from the other. The Métabetchouane River crosses this lake to the northwest over its entire length.

The mouth of Hugh Lake is located at the bottom northwest of the lake, at:
  south of the road bridge of the forest road R0279 which spans the Métabetchouane River;
  east of Ventadour Lake;
  south-east of Grand lac Bostonnais;
  east of the Canadian National railway.

From the mouth of Lake Hugh, the current follows the course of:
 Métabetchouane River on  generally towards the northwest;

Toponymy 
The toponym "Lake Hugh" was formalized on December 5, 1968, by the Commission de toponymie du Québec.

References

Appendices

Related articles 
 La Jacques-Cartier Regional County Municipality
 Lac-Croche, a TNO
 Laurentides Wildlife Reserve
 Métabetchouane River
 Lac Saint-Jean
 Saguenay River
 St. Lawrence River
 List of lakes in Canada

Lakes of Capitale-Nationale
La Jacques-Cartier Regional County Municipality
Laurentides Wildlife Reserve